Ziaul Faruq Apurba (born 27 June 1983), known as Apurba, is a Bangladeshi model and actor. He usually works in television, but has also appeared in films. He is also a singer.

Early life
Apurba's mother, Firoza Ahmed, was an artist of Rajshahi Betar and his maternal grandmother was a presenter in Rajshahi Betar. He won the title of "Mr. Bangladesh" in 2004 in the talent hunt show named "You Got the Looks".

Career
Apurba started his career in Gazi Rakayet's  drama Boibahik in 2006. He made his debut as a model in Amitabh Reza Chowdhury's directed TV commercial for Nescafe. His  TV commercial for Lab Aid also got popularity. Apurba had set up a production house named "ASI Creations Limited" and started directing through the telefilm titled Backdated in 2012. He voiced the title track of Shihab Shaheen’s drama serial  Bhalobasar Chotuskone.

Personal life
Apurba married model and actress Sadia Jahan Prova in August 2010. The couple was divorced in February 2011. He later married Nazia Hassan Audity in December the same year. They were divorced on May 17, 2020. They have a son. In September 2021, he married Shamma Dewan.

Filmography
Apurba's  debut film is Gangster Returns released on 27 November 2015, directed by Ashiqur Rahman. He was also cast in a film Brishti Din, directed by Morshedul Islam, but it was cancelled after a few days shooting.

Television

Web series

TV program

References

External links

Ziaul Faruq Apurba at Localcelebritydetails.com

Living people
People from Dhaka
North South University alumni
Bangladeshi male television actors
Bangladeshi male film actors
21st-century Bangladeshi male actors
1983 births